A Day in a Taxi is a French-language Canadian/French drama film, directed by Robert Ménard and released in 1982.

Plot 
A man named Johnny (Gilles Renaud), who becomes the fall guy for a bank robbery, is released from prison on a 36-hour parole. He takes a taxi driven by Michel (Jean Yanne). During the road trip, Johnny has second thoughts and eventually Michel finds himself in the middle.

Recognition

References

External links 
 
 

1982 films
1982 drama films
Films set in Montreal
French drama films
Films scored by Pierre F. Brault
Films directed by Robert Ménard
Films about taxis
1982 directorial debut films
Canadian drama films
French-language Canadian films
1980s Canadian films
1980s French films